Window Cleaner or variation may refer to:

 Window cleaner or window washer, a person who cleans windows
 Hard-surface cleaner, a class of product used to clean windows
 The Window Cleaner (song), a British comedic song by George Formby, first performed in 1936
 The Window Cleaner (film), a 1968 British short film
 Window Cleaners (film), a 1940 Donald Duck animated short film by Disney

See also
 Window (disambiguation)
 Cleaner (disambiguation)